is a former Japanese football player.

Playing career
Matsuda was born in Shizuoka Prefecture on April 14, 1979. After graduating from Kokushikan University, he joined J2 League club Montedio Yamagata in 2002. However he could not play at all in the match in 2002. Although he played only a match in 2003 Emperor's Cup, he could only play this match and left Montedio end of 2003 season.

Club statistics

References

External links
Montedio Yamagata

1979 births
Living people
Kokushikan University alumni
Association football people from Shizuoka Prefecture
Japanese footballers
J2 League players
Montedio Yamagata players
Association football defenders